Pseudopontia gola is a butterfly in the  family Pieridae. It is found in Sierra Leone and Liberia.

References

Butterflies described in 2011
Pieridae